The PHIRM was an early hacking group which was founded in the early 1980s. First going by the name of "KILOBAUD", the firm was reorganized in 1985 to reflect Airwolf, a favorite television show of the time. By the mid-1980s The PHIRM was sysopping hundreds of boards. Some of the more notable boards included Thieves' Underground sysoped by Jack The Ripper, Angel's Nest sysoped by Archangel, World's Grave Elite sysoped by Sir Gamelord, and SATCOM IV. The PHIRM broke up in 1990, voluntarily, stating that after the Legion of Doom arrests that they had become too high-profile.

In 1985 a Phrack magazine article brought the group into the public eye, and they began to take on new members. In 1987 two of the founders, Archangel and Stingray, co-authored a report on Cleveland's Free-net. In 1989 the group published a definitive guide to breaking security on Bank of America home banking systems. This brought a great deal of scrutiny on the group and there were arrests. At the time of the break-up of the PHIRM, however, there were still over 100 members.

The PHIRM was the last of the "old school" (1980s) hacker groups to disband. Most of the membership disappeared. Others went on to start their own groups.

Founding members 
 Archangel
 Blade Runner
 Jack The Ripper
 Systematic
 The Stingray
 Sir Gamelord
 Meo Dino
 Chris TC Wilson aka Night Crawler

Later members 
 Meo Dino
 Dark Creaper
 The Wiz
 Baron Harkonnen
 Jimmy Jacker
 Electel
 King Blotto
 Da_K3yb0ard_c0w_b0y
 pef (later AnonymousPEF)

References

External links 
Sample Textfile, "Breaking Bank of America's Security"
Phrack Magazine article, Issue #6 - Influential Hacker Groups
2600 Magazine, contributors

Hacker groups